National team appearances in the FIVB Volleyball World Championship may refer to
 National team appearances in the FIVB Volleyball Men's World Championship
 National team appearances in the FIVB Volleyball Women's World Championship